Uresiphita reversalis, the genista broom moth or sophora worm, is a moth in the family Crambidae. It was described by Achille Guenée in 1854. U. reversalis was probably native to Mexico before spreading north and becoming established in Los Angeles by 1930 and the San Francisco Bay Area by 1980. It has since been recorded across the United States and in Cuba, Bermuda, Puerto Rico and Jamaica. Both adults and caterpillars are aposematic.

Description
The wingspan is 27–34 mm. The forewings are light to medium brown with dark antemedial and postmedial lines and two dark discal spots. The hindwings are yellow or orange with brownish-gray shading at the apex. Adults are on wing year round in multiple generations per year in the southern part of the range.

The larvae feed on Acacia, Lonicera, Baptisia (including Baptista leucantha), Genista (including  Genista monspessulana) and Lupinus species (including Lupinus arboreus and Lupinus diffusus), Sophora secundiflora, Lagerstroemia indica, Cytius scoparius and Cytius striatus. The larvae have a brownish-green body and a black head with white dots. The species usually overwinters in the pupal stage, but may also overwinter as an adult.

References

Pyraustinae
Moths described in 1854
Moths of North America
Taxa named by Achille Guenée